Tephritis umbrosa is a species of tephritid or fruit flies in the genus Tephritis of the family Tephritidae.

Distribution
Afghanistan.

References

Tephritinae
Insects described in 1968
Diptera of Asia